Trang Airport  is in Tambon Khok Lo, Mueang Trang District, Trang Province, seven km from Trang town centre.

Major expansion
Despite being solely domestic, passenger numbers have been surging from 143 to almost 800 thousand from 2009 to 2017; and the terminal is being expanded to 9,000 sq m. by mid 2019.  The runway is planned to extend to 3,000 meters pending environmental review.  A second passenger terminal would be built by 2021, pushing capacity to 3.7 million a year.

Airlines and destinations

References

External links
 
 Trang Airport Homepage
 Trang Airport information at Department of Civil Aviation
 Thai Flying Club

Airports in Thailand
Airports established in 1954